Jizzle (born Jerreh Jallow in Bakau, 1994) is a Gambian Afro-pop artist. He received 5 Wah Sa Halat Music Awards, including an artist of the year award in 2018. He has also been nominated for the All Africa Music Awards Best artist in 2016. In 2014, he won the Best Upcoming Artist of the Year 2014 category at the Gambian Entertainment Awards. He is very popular in the country, and is known for blending locally used languages.

Originally aspiring to compete in soccer, Jizzle started in music in 2009 after watching his brother Essa, known as "Breaker" performing music.

He describes being influence by Lil Wayne, Drake, Wizkid, Mr. Eazi, Davido, T-Smalls and Mighty Joe. He is brand ambassador for Africell.

Discography

Albums 

 The Next Big Thing (2018)
 Finally (2019) (featuring Dip Doundou Guiss, Shaydee, Samba, Peuzzi, Bm Jaay, and Hakill)
 Scorpion (2020) 
 "Scorpion Vol. 2" (2021) https://audiomack.com/iamjizzle_/album/scorpion-ep-vol2

References 

The Standard: Wah Sah Halat Music Awards 2020: Full list of nominees released
Music in Africa: Wah Sa Halat Awards
Music in Africa: Gambia's Wah Sa Halat releases 2019 award nominees

Gambian singers
1994 births
Living people
People from Bakau